The 1970–71 Southern Football League season was the 68th in the history of the league, an English football competition.

Yeovil Town won the championship, winning their third Southern League title, whilst Folkestone, Gravesend & Northfleet, Guildford City and Merthyr Tydfil were all promoted to the Premier Division. Eight Southern League clubs applied to join the Football League at the end of the season, but none were successful.

At the end of the season Division One was split into divisions One North and One South with 14 new clubs joining the league.

Premier Division
The Premier Division consisted of 22 clubs, including 18 clubs from the previous season and four new clubs, promoted from Division One:
Ashford Town (Kent)
Bedford Town
Cambridge City
Dartford

League table

Division One
Division One consisted of 20 clubs, including 17 clubs from the previous season and four new clubs, relegated from the Premier Division:
Two clubs relegated from the Premier Division
Burton Albion
Crawley Town

Plus:
Stevenage Athletic, joined from the Metropolitan League

At the end of the season Division One was split into divisions One North and One South with 14 new clubs joining the league.

League table

Football League elections
Alongside the four League clubs facing re-election, a total of 12 non-League clubs applied for election, eight of which were Southern League clubs. All League clubs were re-elected.

See also
 Southern Football League
 1970–71 Northern Premier League

References
RSSF – Southern Football League archive

Southern Football League seasons
S